Maksim Valeryevich Gerin (born 4 September 1984) is a Russian former professional football player. He also holds Moldovan citizenship.

External links
 
 

1984 births
Living people
Russian footballers
Association football midfielders
FC Tiraspol players
FC Lokomotiv Kaluga players
FC Sakhalin Yuzhno-Sakhalinsk players